Zhangmu, Dram, or Khasa in Nepali, is a customs town and port of entry located in Nyalam County on the Nepal-China border, just uphill and across the Bhote Koshi River from the Nepalese town of Kodari.

History
In ancient times, Kodari, the Nepalese village on the other side, was the starting point of a trans-Himalayan caravan route. Newar traders headed north from Kodari and after crossing Kuti pass turned east to continue their journey across the Tibetan Plateau to Lhasa.

The construction of the  Kathmandu-Kodari Road occurred during the 1963–67 period.  It was named China National Highway 318 in China and Araniko Highway in Nepal.

China has long planned and discussed building a railway connecting Lhasa with Zhangmu on the Nepal-China border, from 2008 onwards.  It would be an extension of the  Qinghai-Tibet Railway.  However, as of late 2018, its quite clear China is waiting for Nepalese government to actually seriously commit to a railway from there to Kathmandu through mountainous terrain, which is anticipated to take at least 9 years to build.  (The Chinese side of the route, 500 km, is essentially unpopulated)  Therefore, any railway connecting the current terminus at Xigaze to Kathmandu would be unlikely before 2030.

In 2012, China signed agreement with Nepal to make this one of six ports of entries between Nepal and China.

Zhangmu was evacuated after being damaged by the 2015 earthquakes, which also closed the route between Nepal and China (TAS region). It became a ghost town as trading could not return to previous levels. When the crossing was still closed, traffic began diverting to the border crossing at Gyirong Town and (on the Nepalese side) past Rasuwa Fort further west along the border. Chinese and Nepali officials met in December 2016 to discuss potential reopening of Zhangmu port in 2017, which was blocked by progress of road construction. The checkpoint finally reopened on 29 May 2019.

Transport 
Zhangmu is just north of and above the Friendship Bridge border crossing where China National Highway 318 becomes Araniko Highway and immediately passes Kodari village in Sindhupalchok District en route to Kathmandu. Before the earthquake, tourists traveling between Nepal and the Tibet made substantial use of this crossing, and there was also substantial trans-border trade.

Chinese trucks traveling on the Tibet-Nepal Friendship Highway offload goods at Zhangmu and transfer them to Nepalese trucks. Even though the drive between Zhangmu and Kathmandu is only 5 hours, the sourcing logistics and bureaucracy of cross-border trade takes around 2 weeks, as such in 2013 it takes each Nepalese truck almost half a month for a round trip.

Gallery

References

External links 
 Zhangmu town tourist information 

Populated places in Shigatse
China–Nepal border crossings
Township-level divisions of Tibet
Nyalam County